Filip Horanský (born 7 January 1993) is a tennis player from Slovakia.

Junior career
Filip, with partner Jiří Veselý, won the 2011 Boys Doubles Australian Open. He also won the bronze medal in doubles at 2010 Summer Youth Olympics, partnering Jozef Kovalík.

Professional career

2018
At 2018 Lyon Open, Horanský qualified for the first time into the main draw of an ATP event and he also earned his first win at this level, defeating João Sousa. In second round, he lost to Dušan Lajović in straight sets. Horanský then qualified into the main draw in Antalya, where he lost again to Lajović.

Grand Slam singles performance timeline

Challenger and Futures finals

Singles: 25 (12 titles, 13 runner-ups)

Doubles: 11 (4 titles, 7 runner-ups)

References

External links 
 
 
 
 
 
 

1993 births
Living people
Slovak male tennis players
Sportspeople from Piešťany
Tennis players at the 2010 Summer Youth Olympics
Australian Open (tennis) junior champions
Grand Slam (tennis) champions in boys' doubles